George Gwynne (c. 1623 – 1673) was a Welsh politician who sat in the House of Commons at various times between 1654 and 1660.

Gwynne was the son of David Gwynne and his wife Joan Morgan daughter of George Morgan of Itton, Monmouthshire. He  inherited Pencoyd Castle Monmouthshire from his uncle Christopher Morgan. In April1654, he was elected Member of Parliament for Radnorshire in the First Protectorate Parliament.  He was a J P for Radnorshire in 1655. In 1656, he was re-elected MP for Radnorshire  for the Second Protectorate Parliament.

In 1660, Gwynne was re-elected MP for Radnorshire in the Convention Parliament. He was one of those nominated for the Knight of the Royal Oak award in 1660. He was listed as one of the Justices of the Peace for Breconshire in 1666.

References

1623 births
1673 deaths
Members of the Parliament of England (pre-1707) for constituencies in Wales
Year of birth uncertain
People from Radnorshire
English MPs 1654–1655
English MPs 1656–1658
English MPs 1660